Mahoungou is a Congolese surname that may refer to:

Alice Mahoungou (born 1939), trade unionist and politician from the Republic of the Congo
Anthony Mahoungou (born 1994), French professional gridiron football wide receiver

Surnames of Congolese origin
Kongo-language surnames